Christoph Behr (born 21 March 1989) is a German footballer who plays as a forward for ASCK Simbach am Inn.

Career
Behr made his professional debut for Wacker Burghausen in the 3. Liga on 16 October 2010, starting the match before coming off in the 77th minute for Markus Grübl in the 2–0 away win against SV Babelsberg.

References

External links
 Profile at DFB.de
 Profile at kicker.de
 FC Alkofen statistics 2013–14
 FC Alkofen statistics 2014–15
 ASCK Simbach am Inn statistics 2015–16
 ASCK Simbach am Inn statistics 2016–17
 ASCK Simbach am Inn statistics 2017–18

1989 births
Living people
People from Vilshofen an der Donau
Sportspeople from Lower Bavaria
Footballers from Bavaria
German footballers
Association football forwards
SV Wacker Burghausen players
3. Liga players
Regionalliga players
TSV Buchbach players